Mister International 2014 was the 9th edition of the Mister International pageant. It was held on February 14, 2015 at the Grand Ballroom, Grand Hilton Seoul in Seoul, South Korea. Jose Anmer Paredes of Venezuela crowned Neil Perez of the Philippines at the end of the event. This year, 29 contestants from around the world participated. This is the first time Philippines won the pageant.

Results

Placements

Special awards

Contestants

References

External links
Mister International Official Website

2014 beauty pageants
Mister International